Stephen Thomas (December 6, 1809 – December 18, 1903), manufacturer, politician, jurist, and Union Army officer. He was a recipient of the Medal of Honor for gallantry.

Early life
Thomas was born in Bethel, Vermont, the son of John and Rebecca (Batchellor) Thomas. His father died while serving in the U.S. 31st Infantry during the War of 1812. His grandfather, Joseph, served in a New Hampshire regiment during the American Revolution. Thomas was only four years old when his father died, and he started work young to help his widowed mother. He apprenticed in the woolen industry, then started his own business, which was destroyed by fire, and finally ended up in the manufacturing business in West Fairlee.

On January 13, 1830, Thomas married Ann Peabody of Reading. She died in West Fairlee on January 8, 1877. They were the parents of two children, son Hartop and daughter Amanda.

In the 1830s and 1840s, Thomas served in the Vermont Militia. He rose through the ranks, and commanded the 19th Regiment's Rifle Company as a captain.

Political career
He represented the town of West Fairlee in the Vermont House of Representatives in 1838, 1839, 1845, 1846, 1860 and 1861. He was a state senator, representing Orange County from 1849 to 1851, and a delegate to the state Constitutional Conventions in 1843 and 1850. He served a register of probate for the district of Bradford from 1842 to 1846, and probate judge from 1847 to 1849.

He was a Democrat until the outbreak of the American Civil War, an alternate to the Democratic national convention of 1848, delegate for the next three conventions, in 1852, 1856 and 1860, and candidate for Lieutenant Governor in 1860.

Governor Erastus Fairbanks called an extra session of the State Legislature on April 23, 1861, which Thomas attended. He was a member of the Ways and Means committee, which intended to report out a bill appropriating half a million dollars for military purposes. Thomas presented an impassioned speech supporting an amendment that doubled the amount to one million dollars. He said "Until this rebellion shall have been put down, I have no friends to reward and no enemies to punish, and I trust that the whole strength and power of Vermont, both of men and of money, will be put into the field to sustain the government."

After some spirited debate in the full house, the measure was passed unanimously. Thomas also supported passage of a bill giving every non-commissioned officer and private seven dollars a month in addition to their Federal pay, and that bill was enacted as well.

Military career
Thomas was commissioned as colonel of the 8th Vermont Infantry on November 12, 1861, and proceeded to recruit the regiment, which was destined to be part of Benjamin F. Butler's New England Division. The regiment left Vermont for the Department of the Gulf on March 4, 1862, and Thomas commanded it through May 1863, when he assumed command of the 2nd Brigade, 1st Division, XIX Corps, which included the 8th Vermont. During this period, the 8th Vermont participated in the Occupation of New Orleans, and battles at Raceland, Boutte Station, Bayou des Allemands, Bisland, and Port Hudson.

In July 1864, a portion of the XIX Corps, including the 8th Vermont, was transferred to the eastern theater of the war. They arrived at Fortress Monroe just in time to join the VI Corps in the Shenandoah Valley, and participate in Major General Philip Sheridan's campaign against the Confederacy's Jubal Early. Thomas commanded the 2nd Brigade, 1st Division from October 15 to October 24, and again from November 1 to December 3, which included the 8th Vermont, 12th Connecticut, 160th New York and 47th Pennsylvania infantry regiments. During this period, the 8th Vermont participated in the Battle of Opequon, Battle of Fisher's Hill, Battle of Cedar Creek, and Newton, Virginia. In 1892 he received the Medal of Honor for "distinguished conduct in a desperate hand-to-hand encounter, in which the advance of the enemy was checked," at Cedar Creek on October 19, 1864.

Thomas was appointed Brigadier General of Volunteers on February 1, 1865, and mustered out of the service August 24, 1865.

Postwar
General Thomas started the war as a Democrat, but by the time he returned home, he was a Republican. "But the opposition of the old party, whose favorite he had been, would not permit it, and he was obliged to defend his course in public. The leaders with whom he had affiliated said to him after his return from the war, 'THOMAS, you've changed; we haven't.' 'Fools never do,' was his reply.

He refused to be a candidate for governor, but did serve as lieutenant governor in 1867 and 1868 under Governor John B. Page. He served as a delegate to the soldiers' convention that nominated General Ulysses S. Grant for the presidency.

He was appointed by President Grant as a U.S. pension agent in 1870, and served in that capacity for eight years. In the late 1880s Thomas was president of the U.S. Clothes Pin Company, of Montpelier, which had 15 employees and customers worldwide. He was also president of the North Haverhill Granite Company.

He served as commander of the Department of Vermont, Grand Army of the Republic, and as president of the Vermont Officers' Reunion Society. He was Companion #09174 of the Military Order of the Loyal Legion of the United States, or MOLLUS, through its Vermont Commandery.

General Thomas died in Montpelier, and was buried at Green Mount Cemetery in Montpelier.

Medal of Honor citation
Rank and organization: Colonel, 8th Vermont Infantry. Place and date: At Cedar Creek, Va., October 19, 1864. Entered service at: Montpelier, Vt. Birth: Vermont. Date of issue: July 25, 1892.

Citation:

Distinguished conduct in a desperate hand to hand encounter, in which the advance of the enemy was checked.

See also

List of Medal of Honor recipients
List of American Civil War Medal of Honor recipients: T–Z
List of American Civil War generals (Union)

Notes

References
Benedict, G. G., Vermont in the Civil War. A History of the part taken by the Vermont Soldiers And Sailors in the War For The Union, 1861-5. Burlington, VT.: The Free Press Association, 1888, pp. 304, 750.
Carpenter, George N. History of the Eighth Regiment Vermont Volunteers. 1861-1865. Issued by the committee of publication. Boston, Press of Deland & Barta, 1886, too numerous to detail.
Child, Hamilton, Gazetteer of Orange County, Vt. 1762-1888, Syracuse, NY: Syracuse Journal Company, 1888, pp. 506–510.
Crockett, Walter Hill, Vermont The Green Mountain State, New York: The Century History Company, Inc., 1921, p. 587.
Ullery, Jacob G., compiler, Men of Vermont: An Illustrated Biographical History of Vermonters and Sons of Vermont, Brattleboro, VT: Transcript Publishing Company, 1894, part 2, p. 396.

Further reading
Coffin, Howard, Full Duty: Vermonters in the Civil War. Woodstock, VT.: Countryman Press, 1995.
Peck, Theodore S., compiler, ''Revised Roster of Vermont Volunteers and lists of Vermonters Who Served in the Army and Navy of the United States During the War of the Rebellion, 1861-66. Montpelier, VT.: Press of the Watchman Publishing Co., 1892.

External links

1809 births
1903 deaths
Union Army generals
United States Army Medal of Honor recipients
People of Vermont in the American Civil War
Lieutenant Governors of Vermont
Members of the Vermont House of Representatives
People from Bethel, Vermont
American Civil War recipients of the Medal of Honor
Burials at Green Mount Cemetery (Montpelier, Vermont)
19th-century American politicians
Grand Army of the Republic officials